Gregory C. Johnson (March 16, 1971 – July 7, 2019) was a professional ice hockey player in the National Hockey League with the Detroit Red Wings, Pittsburgh Penguins, Chicago Blackhawks, and Nashville Predators.

In over 700 career NHL games, Johnson earned 350 points from 134 goals and 216 assists.  His best season was in 1998–99 where he achieved 16 goals and 34 assists.

Playing career

Amateur
Born in Thunder Bay, Ontario, Johnson recorded 96 points in 47 games for the local Thunder Bay Flyers of the USHL in 1988–89.

Johnson played four years at the University of North Dakota where he led the WCHA in assists twice and was placed on the conference First All-Star Team three straight years from 1991 to 1993. He was also placed on the NCAA West First All-American Team in 1991 and 1993 and the Second Team in 1992.

Professional
Johnson was drafted by the Philadelphia Flyers as the 33rd pick in the second round of the 1989 NHL Entry Draft, but never played for the organization.  On June 20, 1993, he was traded from the Flyers with future considerations to the Detroit Red Wings for Jim Cummins and a fourth round pick in the 1993 NHL Entry Draft.  Red Wings head coach and general manager Bryan Murray specifically targeted Johnson as a skilled center whom the Wings could develop.

Johnson spent parts of four seasons with the Red Wings from 1993 to 1997.  On January 27, 1997, Johnson was traded by the Red Wings to the Pittsburgh Penguins for winger Tomas Sandstrom.  The Wings, who were looking to add a more physical element and had depth down the middle, traded from a position of strength by sending the skilled center for the rugged veteran forward. The move paid off for the Wings, as they went on to win the 1996-97 Stanley Cup.

Johnson played the rest of the 1996–97 season and part of the 1997–98 season with the Penguins before being traded to the Blackhawks for Tuomas Gronman on October 22, 1997.

Johnson was the 23rd pick of the 1998 NHL Expansion Draft by the Predators from the Blackhawks.  He would go on to spend the final seven years of his career with the team.  Johnson was the second captain in Nashville Predators history, and served in that capacity from 2002 until 2006.  He had previously served as an alternate captain from 1999 to 2002.

Johnson became part of an anomaly during the 2005–06 season when he was credited with scoring a goal before the start of a game against the Detroit Red Wings.  On November 21, 2005, he scored a goal during the first period of a game that was eventually postponed after Red Wings defender Jiri Fischer suffered a cardiac arrest.  The game was replayed on January 23, 2006, and, while the full game was replayed, Johnson's goal was allowed to stand, thus giving Nashville a 1–0 lead before the opening faceoff.

On August 14, 2006, Johnson signed a one-year contract to rejoin his former team, the Detroit Red Wings. In September 2006, during a routine preseason physical, an EKG test returned abnormal results. Johnson had further testing, and eventually decided to retire before training camp.

International play
Johnson earned a silver medal representing Canada at the 1994 Lillehammer Olympics.  He also played for the Canadian National Team in the 1992–93 and 1993–94 seasons.

Personal life
Johnson's brother Ryan was also a professional hockey player, playing for five teams over a fifteen-year NHL career.

On July 7, 2019, Johnson's wife Kristin found him dead in the basement of their Detroit home. No cause of death has been given, but police reports concluded that it was suicide by firearm. Johnson was 48 and survived by his wife and their two daughters.

Career statistics

Regular season and playoffs

International

Awards and honours

References

External links
 

1971 births
2019 suicides
Adirondack Red Wings players
Canadian ice hockey centres
Chicago Blackhawks players
Detroit Red Wings players
Ice hockey people from Ontario
Sportspeople from Thunder Bay
Ice hockey players at the 1994 Winter Olympics
Medalists at the 1994 Winter Olympics
Nashville Predators players
Olympic ice hockey players of Canada
Olympic medalists in ice hockey
Olympic silver medalists for Canada
Philadelphia Flyers draft picks
Pittsburgh Penguins players
Thunder Bay Flyers players
North Dakota Fighting Hawks men's ice hockey players
Suicides by firearm in Michigan
AHCA Division I men's ice hockey All-Americans
2019 deaths